Salvia microstegia is a herbaceous perennial plant in the family Lamiaceae. It is native to Israel, growing on Mount Hermon. The plant has white or pale violet flowers, blooming from June to September.

References

External links
 Photo from Flora of Israel

microstegia
Flora of Lebanon
Taxa named by Benjamin Balansa
Taxa named by Pierre Edmond Boissier